Himachal Pradesh Cricket Association is the governing body of the Cricket activities in the Himachal Pradesh state of India and the Himachal Pradesh cricket team. It is affiliated to the Board of Control for Cricket in India.

History 

Himachal Pradesh Cricket Association is affiliated with the Board of Control for Cricket in India. HPCA is one of the Premier Cricket Governing provincial units affiliated to The Board of Control for Cricket in India and operates from Shimla. HPCA was established in 1960 and was granted first-class cricket status in September 1984 and played in 1984/85 season. Anurag Thakur took over Himachal Pradesh Cricket Association president-ship in 2000 as fourth president of the board and after becoming President of BCCI in 2016, he was removed from the post of HPCA President.

HPCA started construction of Himachal Pradesh Cricket Association Stadium in 2005 with cost of 60 crores and with capacity of 25,000 person. The stadium is the only stadium which can host test matches also hosted IPL matches of Kings XI Punjab as their second home. HPCA has also constructed stadium in Atal Bihari Vajpayee Stadium in Nadaun as well as Lohnu Cricket Ground in Bilaspur.

In 2006-07, Himachal Pradesh won the Plate Group of the Ranji Trophy, beating Orissa in the final[3] after finishing top of their group.

In December 2015, Asian Cricket Council decided to set up Centre of Excellence at Dharmashala as well as Himachal Pradesh Cricket Association Stadium will host its 2016 ICC World Twenty20, but due to continuous opposition from people the venue shifted.

Divisional Association Members

 Cricket Association of Bilaspur
 Hamirpur Cricket Association
 Kangra District Cricket Association
 Cricket Association of Kinnaur
 Kullu District Cricket Association
 District Cricket Association Lahaul & Spiti
 Cricket Association of Mandi
 Shimla District Cricket Association
 Sirmour District Cricket Association
 Solan District Cricket Association
 District Cricket Association Una
 Adhoc Committee Chamba

Home ground 

 Atal Bihari Vajpayee Stadium, Nadaun
 Chail Cricket Ground, Chail
Himachal Pradesh Cricket Ground, Gumma, Shimla
 Himachal Pradesh Cricket Association Stadium, Dharmashala - only Test venue
 Indira Gandhi Stadium, Una
 Jawaharlal Navoday Vidhyalay Stadium, Una
 Kangda Police Stadium, Kangda
 Lohnu Cricket Ground, Bilaspur
 Maharaja Lakshman Sen Memorial College Ground
 Paramount Cricket Promotion Association Stadium
 Police Stadium, Chamba
 Shaheed Krishan Chand Memorial Stadium

Umpires 

 Virender Sharma, BCCI Elite Panel

Himachal Cricket Academy 

In 2008, the HPCA established Himachal Cricket Academy in at Himachal Pradesh Cricket Association Stadium in Dharmashala with sub-academies in Kangra, MCM Chandigarh as well as all the twelve District Headquarters. The academy provides regular cricket coaching, systematic fitness management, specific nutrition, regular health check up and purposeful recreation along with the education to the potentially talented young cricketers. The academy is headed by Anuj Pal Dass.

References

External links
 Cricinfo's Complete History of the Indian Domestic Competitions
 HPCA Official

Cricket administration in India
Cricket in Himachal Pradesh
Sports organizations established in 1960
Organisations based in Himachal Pradesh
1960 establishments in Himachal Pradesh